Annemasse Aerodrome or Marcel Bruchon Aerodrome , is an airport in Annemasse, a commune in Haute-Savoie, France.

References 

External links 
 Web-site

Airports in Auvergne-Rhône-Alpes
Buildings and structures in Haute-Savoie